The Picts, the people of eastern Scotland in the medieval Scotland, have frequently been represented in literature and popular culture.

Visual arts 
Thematic Pictish history and imagery has been appropriated by multiple contemporary fine artists, most notably American ex-pat Marianna Lines, British artists Lisa Wright and Jon Hodgson, as well as American artist F. Lennox Campello.

Fairies and Picts
David MacRitchie was an outspoken proponent of the euhemeristic origin of fairies being the folk memory of Picts. He argued they were rooted in a real diminutive or pygmy-statured indigenous population that lived during the late Stone Age across the British Isles, especially Scotland:

MacRitchie developed what became known as the "Pygmy-Pict theory" in his The Testimony of Tradition (1890) and Fians, Fairies and Picts (1893) regarding fairies to have been folk memories of the aboriginal Picts who in his view were of very small size, pointing to findings of short doors (3 – 4 ft in height) of chambers, underground dwellings, long barrows, as well as quoting old literature such as Adam of Bremen's Historia Norwegiæ which describe the Picts of Orkney as "only a little exceeding pygmies in stature". The folklorist John Francis Campbell, who MacRitchie cited, had also written in his Popular Tales of the West Highlands (1860–62):

Robert Louis Stevenson described so the Picts in his Heather Ale poem:
Rudely plucked from their hiding,
   Never a word they spoke:
A son and his aged father—
   Last of the dwarfish folk.
Modern archaeological studies demonstrate that the Picts were not significantly different in height from the present-day occupants of Scotland.

Examples
 Pulp fiction author Robert E. Howard wrote extensively about his romanticized version of the Picts, especially in his short stories revolving around the fictional character Bran Mak Morn, but also in many other of his stories.  In his Conan the Barbarian series, the Picts are described as very similar in culture to the indigenous peoples of the Northeastern Woodlands, especially the Iroquois or Wyandot.
 Rudyard Kipling devotes several chapters to the Picts in his book Puck of Pook's Hill.
 Historical fantasy author Juliet Marillier's series The Bridei Chronicles tells of the Picts and Gaels in the sixth century A.D.
 Nancy Farmer's series The Sea of Trolls depicts fictional Picts.
 In his poem "An Irish Monk on Lindisfarne", Gael Turnbull wrote,

 Anne Rice also wrote of fictional Picts, crafting them into the Taltos for her book series The Lives of the Mayfair Witches.
 Karen Marie Moning also wrote about the Picts for her third novel of the Highlander Series The Highlander's Touch.
 Another use of the Picts in a fantasy setting comes in Jacqueline Carey's Kushiel's Legacy fantasy series concerning the Kingdom of Alba and the Picts, and their dealings with Terre D'Ange.
 Matthew Stover's Bronze Age fantasy novels Iron Dawn and Jericho Moon chronicle the adventures of Barra Coll Eigg Rhum, a Pictish princess.
 The 1982 film Conan The Barbarian features bodybuilder Franco Columbu in a cameo as a blue-tattooed Pictish scout.
 The 2004 film King Arthur depicts Celts and Picts (called "Woads" in the film) as tattooed and painted savage forest people, led by the dark magician Merlin. Originally enemies to Arthur and his knights, they later unite to defeat the Saxons at Badon Hill.
 Neil Marshall's 2010 film Centurion features a conflict between a band of Picts and the Roman Ninth Legion.
 In Terry Pratchett's Discworld novels, particularly those featuring the Lancre witches, the Picts are an obvious influence on the Nac Mac Feegle, a race of tiny wood-fairies whose speech is influenced by Scots Leid and who are tattooed with blue war-paint. In Carpe Jugulum, they are called "Pictsies."
 Arthur Ransome, celebrated author of the classic Swallows and Amazons series of books, titled the eleventh book of the series "The Picts and the Martyrs". Published in 1943, it features the adventures of a group of children holidaying in the Lake District.  In the book, two of the children are unexpectedly forced to live secretly in a ruined house in the woods, and they become "Picts". Another two must endure the unwanted presence of their Great Aunt, thus becoming "Martyrs". A general description of historical Picts is given by one of the children when they first take that name, and a somewhat more detailed explanation is given later by a parent in a letter.
 Jack Dixon's The Pict, historical fiction, is told from the point of view of the 1st century Picts who resisted invasion by two Roman legions, the Ninth and the Twentieth, led by Gnaeus Julius Agricola in 83 C.E. The main character (Calach) is the Caledonian leader (Calgacus) who united the twenty Pictish tribes against the Roman invasion. The antagonist (Agricola) is sent by the emperor to conquer the whole of the British Isles or not return to Rome. The story offers an alternative to Tacitus's account of the battle of Mons Graupius, and it credits the unified Pictish resistance with a pivotal role in the development of the Scottish nation.
 British rock band Pink Floyd performed a song on their 1969 Ummagumma album entitled "Several Species of Small Furry Animals Gathered Together in a Cave and Grooving with a Pict."
 In the 2011 film The Eagle, directed by Kevin Macdonald, and starring Channing Tatum, Jamie Bell and Donald Sutherland. Adapted by Jeremy Brock from Rosemary Sutcliff's historical adventure novel The Eagle of the Ninth (1954), the film tells the story of a young Roman officer searching to recover the lost Roman eagle standard of his father's legion in the northern part of Great Britain. The story is based on the Ninth Spanish Legion's supposed disappearance in Britain. Aquila decides to recover it. Despite the warnings of his uncle and his fellow Romans, who believe that no Roman can survive north of Hadrian's Wall, he travels north into the territory of the "Picts", accompanied only by his slave, Esca.
 In the 2012 game Civilization V: Gods & Kings, the Pictish Warrior is the unique unit of the Celtic civilization.
 In the 2013 volume Asterix and the Picts, Asterix and Obelix meet the Picts.
 The Charlemagne downloadable content was released for the 2012 game Crusader Kings II. The Picts are an existing culture, but may later become Scottish.
 In the 2015 game Total War: Attila the Picts are a playable faction in the Celts DLC Culture Pack.
 In the 2015 mobile game Fate/Grand Order, Mordred says that the Picts of her time were "far beyond" any tribes or barbarians, and compares them to aliens from modern-day sci-fi movies.
 The 2017 Doctor Who episode "The Eaters of Light" is set in Scotland at the time of the Picts' wars with the Romans.
 In the 2017 video game Hellblade: Senua's Sacrifice, the player character is a Pictish woman.
 The 2018 strategy game Total War Saga: Thrones of Britannia features the Pictish kingdom of Circenn as a playable faction.
 The 2022 Viking-epic film, The Northman (directed by Robert Eggers), features a character titled as “Halldora the Pict” played by Katie Dickie.

References

Bibliography

 
Topics in popular culture